Harrassowitz Verlag is a German academic publishing house, based in Wiesbaden. It publishes about 250 scholarly books and periodicals per year on Oriental, Slavic, and Book and Library Studies. The publishing house is part of the company Otto Harrassowitz GmbH & Co. KG, founded by Otto Harrassowitz, which is a book vendor for academic and research libraries, founded in Leipzig in 1872.

External links

1872 establishments in Germany
Publishing companies established in 1872
Academic publishing companies
Book publishing companies of Germany
Mass media in Wiesbaden